The present highway network in New South Wales, Australia was established in August 1928 when the Country Roads Board (the predecessor of the Department of Main Roads, Roads & Traffic Authority and Roads & Maritime Services) superseded the 1924 main road classifications and established the basis of the existing New South Wales main road system. (the full list of main roads gazetted appears in the Government Gazette of the State of New South Wales of 17 August 1928). The number of a road for administrative purposes is not the same as the route number it carries e.g. the Great Western Highway is Highway 5 for administrative purposes but is signposted as part of route A32.)

Many major routes in New South Wales, including Sydney motorways and even some routes named as "highways" are not officially gazetted as highways. For a list of all numbered routes in New South Wales, see List of road routes in New South Wales.

While highways in many other countries are typically identified by number, highways in Australia, including New South Wales, are known mostly by names. These names typically come from 19th-century explorers, important politicians or geographic regions.

List of gazetted highways

See also

 Highways in Australia for highways in other states and territories
 List of highways in Australia for roads named as highways, but not necessarily classified as highways
 List of road routes in New South Wales for all major routes in New South Wales

References

 
 
New
Lists of buildings and structures in New South Wales